Robert Arlen Lusk (May 18, 1932 - October 26, 2022) was an American retired professional football player who was a center for the Detroit Lions of the National Football League (NFL). He played in five games in the 1956 season after his collegiate career at William & Mary.

References

1932 births
Living people
Detroit Lions players
People from Williamson, West Virginia
Players of American football from West Virginia
William & Mary Tribe football players